The 2000–01 Croatian First Football League was the tenth season of the Croatian First Football League, Croatia's top association football league, since its establishment in 1992. It began on 30 July 2000 and ended on 27 May 2001. Dinamo Zagreb were the defending champions, having won their fifth consecutive title the previous season. The 2000–01 Prva HNL was contested by 12 teams and was won by Hajduk Split, who won their thirteenth title, after a win against Varteks on 27 May 2001, which was ended the Dinamo Zagreb (then Croatia Zagreb)'s five-year dominance.

Teams
A total of twelve teams contested the league, including ten sides from the 1999–2000 season and two promoted teams from the 1999–2000 Croatian Second Football League, Čakovec and Marsonia. Marsonia had returned to top flight after one previous three-season spell in the Prva HNL between 1994 and 1997, while Čakovec saw its top flight debut after coming close to promotion in 1998 and 1999 (they lost the promotion play-offs on both occasions).

Changes from last season
Teams promoted from 1999–2000 Croatian Second Football League
 Champions: Marsonia
 Runners-up: Čakovec

Teams relegated to 2000–01 Croatian Second Football League
 11th placed: Istra Pula
 12th placed: Vukovar '91

Summaries

The following is an overview of teams which competed in the 2000–01 Prva HNL. The list of managers is correct as of 30 July 2000, the first day of the season.

Managerial changes

First stage

Rounds 1–22 results

Championship group

Rounds 23–32 results

Relegation group

Rounds 23–32 results

Relegation play-off
Due to the expansion of Prva HNL to 16 clubs in the 2001–02 season, four clubs from the 2000–01 Druga HNL were automatically promoted. Those should have been top four clubs, but since third-placed Croatia Sesvete and sixth-placed Belišće had decided to step back from promotion, 1st, 2nd, 4th and 5th placed second level teams were automatically promoted for the following season (Kamen Ingrad, Pomorac Kostrena, Zadar and TŠK Topolovac respectively). Therefore, the 12th placed Marsonia played a two-legged relegation play-off against the 7th placed team of Druga HNL, Solin. The tie ended in a 5–5 aggregate score and Marsonia won it on away goals, thereby staying in the Prva HNL for the following season.

Top goalscorers 

Notes
1 Including six goals scored in Slaven Belupo's 7–1 home win against Varteks on 22 October 2000, which is the record for most goals scored by a single player in a Prva HNL match. 
2 Ivica Olić scored 11 goals during the regular Prva HNL season and this is the tally as recorded by official records kept by Prva HNL. However, he scored an additional 5 goals in Marsonia's two-legged relegation play-off against second level side Solin, and the total of 16 goals was included in top scoring tables published in the Croatian media at the end of the season.

See also
2000–01 Croatian Football Cup
2000–01 Croatian Second Football League
2000–01 in Croatian football

References

External links
Season statistics at HRNogomet
2000–01 in Croatian Football at Rec.Sport.Soccer Statistics Foundation

Croatian Football League seasons
Cro
Prva Hnl, 2000-01